Werner J.A. Dahm (born 1957) is an ASU Foundation Professor of Aerospace and Mechanical Engineering at Arizona State University. Dahm is the director of the Security & Defense Systems Initiative at ASU.

Dahm is Emeritus Professor of Aerospace Engineering at University of Michigan. He is a member of the United States Air Force Scientific Advisory Board.

Life 
Dahm graduated from University of Alabama in Huntsville and the California Institute of Technology.

References

External links 
 Media

Living people
People from Huntsville, Alabama
Fellows of the American Institute of Aeronautics and Astronautics
1957 births
Chief Scientists of the United States Air Force
University of Michigan faculty
Fellows of the American Physical Society